The Association of University Administrators (AUA) is the professional body for higher education administrators and managers in the United Kingdom and Republic of Ireland.

The AUA was formed from a merger of the Association of Polytechnic Administrators (APA) and the Conference of University Administrators (CUA). CUA traced its history back to the Meeting of University Academic Administrative Staff, founded in 1961. The association marked the golden jubilee of the professionalisation of support staff in UK universities in 2011.

Professional values
The AUA exists to advance and assist in the advancement of education by fostering sound methods of leadership, management and administration in further and higher education by education, training, and other means.

AUA members are individually and collectively committed to:

 Advancing education for public benefit through sharing professional knowledge and practice
 Developing their own and others’ professional practice
 Actively championing a professional culture of equality, diversity and inclusion
 Working to the highest standards of fair, ethical and transparent professional behaviour

These values underpin the nine professional behaviours of the AUA CPD Framework.

Professional development
The AUA CPD (Continuing Professional Development) Framework is a tool that supports the career development of higher education professionals. It works on an organisational and individual level, for professionals at all career stages, and can be applied across all roles in the sector.

The AUA Accreditation Scheme provides a clear path to Accredited Membership (AMAUA) and Fellowship (FAUA), which recognise a deeper commitment to ongoing professional development and acknowledge the impact and influence of this on professional practice.

The AUA Postgraduate Certificate in Higher Education Administration, Management and Leadership, delivered in partnership with Nottingham Trent University, is a self-directed, independent, work-based learning programme for higher education professionals working within UK higher education administration.

Publications
The quarterly journal of the Association of University Administrators, Perspectives: Policy and Practice in Higher Education, is published by Taylor and Francis.

A series of Good Practice Guides available to members, first published by CUA in 1986, aims to share and promote best practice in HE.

Conference
The AUA's annual conference and exhibition is the largest professional development conference in the UK HE calendar, with plenary and keynote presentations and around 100 working sessions.

Internationally, the AUA maintains reciprocal agreements with similar organisations, which allow members to attend partner conferences.

Governance
The association is a Charitable Incorporated Organisation, managed and administered by a Board of Trustees. Following election, the Chair-elect serves as Vice-Chair of the Association for one year before taking office; upon completion of a term of office, the retiring Chair serves as Vice-Chair for a further year:

An Honorary President of the Association is appointed by the Board of Trustees:

See also
 Higher education
 Academic administration
 Professional association
 Professional development
 Association for Tertiary Education Management

References

External links
 
 European Association of Research Managers and Administrators
 American Association of Collegiate Registrars and Admissions Officers (International Reciprocal Partner)
 American Association of University Administrators

Academic administration
Education-related professional associations
Higher education organisations based in the United Kingdom
Organisations based in Manchester
Organizations established in 1961
University Administrators
Universities in the United Kingdom
University of Manchester